Rough River Dam State Resort Park is a Kentucky state park encompassing  on Rough River Lake in Grayson county.

The lake is home to a variety of bass including largemouth, smallmouth, Guadalupe, spotted, white, yellow, and striped bass as well as other game fish, making fishing a significant portion of its tourism.

References

External links
Rough River Dam State Resort Park Kentucky Department of Parks

Protected areas of Breckinridge County, Kentucky
Protected areas of Hardin County, Kentucky
Protected areas of Grayson County, Kentucky
State parks of Kentucky